Louis Silvie Zamperini (January 26, 1917 – July 2, 2014) was an American World War II veteran, an Olympic distance runner and a Christian Evangelist. He took up running in high school and qualified for the United States in the 5,000 m race for the 1936 Berlin Olympics, finishing 8th while setting a new lap record in the process.

Zamperini was commissioned in the United States Army Air Forces as a lieutenant. He served as a bombardier on B-24 Liberators in the Pacific. On a search and rescue mission, his plane experienced mechanical difficulties and crashed into the ocean. After drifting at sea on a life raft for 47 days, with two other crewmates, Zamperini landed on the Japanese-occupied Marshall Islands and was captured.

He was taken to four different prisoner-of-war camps (total) in Japan where he was tortured and beaten by Japanese military personnel—specifically by Mutsuhiro Watanabe—due to Zamperini's status as a famous Olympic runner. He was later taken to a new prison camp at a coal factory, and after much hardship, he was finally released. Following the war he initially struggled to overcome his ordeal, battling with post-traumatic stress disorder.

He later became a Christian evangelist with a strong belief in forgiveness. From 1952 onwards, he devoted himself to at-risk youth. Zamperini is the subject of three biographical films: Unbroken (2014), its sequel Unbroken: Path to Redemption (2018), and Captured by Grace (2015).

Early life
Louis Zamperini was born on January 26, 1917, in Olean, New York, to Anthony Zamperini and Louise Dossi, both native to Verona in northern Italy. He had an older brother named Pete and two younger sisters, Virginia and Sylvia. He was raised in a strict, devout Catholic household. Regardless, he took up smoking and drinking at a very young age. He struggled with bullies and supposedly almost died twice, once due to a house fire, and another from having fallen into an oil rig and almost drowning. In later childhood, his brother Pete was highly supportive of him and encouraged him to start his running career.

Childhood
The Zamperini family moved from Olean, New York to Long Beach, California when Louis Zamperini was two years old. In 1919, the family moved to nearby Torrance where Louis attended Torrance High School. He and his family spoke no English when they moved to California, making him a target for bullies because of his Italian roots. His father taught him how to box in self-defense. Soon he claimed to be "beating the tar out of every one of them; but I was so good at it that I started relishing the idea of getting even. I was sort of addicted to it."

High school
To stop him from getting into trouble as a rebel, his older brother Pete got Zamperini involved in the school track team, where Pete was already a star. Before then, in the ninth grade, Zamperini's classmates challenged him to a footrace. Louis came in last, and was humiliated. Pete took Louis on several training runs. Zamperini began winning races, and he was getting much faster. After Louis found his role model, Glenn Cunningham, he took up distance running. At the end of his freshman year, he finished fifth in the All City C-division 660 yard (600 m) dash. 

After a summer of running in 1932, starting with his first cross-country race, and throughout the last three years of high school, he was undefeated. He started beating his brother's records. In 1934, he set an interscholastic record for the mile, clocking in at 4 minutes, 21.2 seconds at the preliminary meeting to the California state championships. The following week, he won the CIF California State Meet championships with a time of 4 minutes and 27.8 seconds.  That record helped him win a scholarship to the University of Southern California. During his college life at USC, he was part of the Delta Eta chapter of the Kappa Sigma fraternity.

In 1936, Zamperini decided to try out for the Olympics. In those days, athletes had to pay their way to the Olympic trials, but since his father worked for the railroad, Louis could get a train ticket free of charge. A group of Torrance merchants raised enough money for the local hero to live on once he got there. The competition for the 1,500 meters spot was fierce that year, with eventual silver medalist Glenn Cunningham, Archie San Romani, and Gene Venzke all challenging to get on the team.

Zamperini did not contest the 1,500 meters; instead, he ran the 5,000 meters. On one of the hottest days of the year during the 1936 North American heat wave in Randalls Island, New York, the race saw co-favorite Norm Bright and several others collapse during the race. It was reported that 40 people died from the heat in Manhattan alone that week. With a sprint finish at the end, Zamperini finished in a dead-heat tie against American record-holder Don Lash and qualified for the 1936 Summer Olympics in Berlin, Germany. Having qualified at age 19 years, 178 days, he remains the youngest American 5,000 meters qualifier.

Olympics
Neither Zamperini nor Lash was believed to have much chance of winning the 1936 Olympics 5,000-meter race against world record holder Lauri Lehtinen. Zamperini later related several anecdotes from his Olympic experience, including gorging himself on the boat trip to Europe: "I was a Depression-era kid who had never even been to a drugstore for a sandwich in his life," he said, "and all the food was free. I had not just one sweet roll, but about seven every morning, with bacon and eggs. My eyes were like saucers." By the end of the trip, Louis Zamperini, in common with most athletes on the ship, had gained a good deal of weight: in Zamperini's case, . While the weight gain was not advantageous for his running, it was necessary for his health, as he had lost  while training in the summer heat in New York for the Olympic Trials.

Zamperini finished 8th in the 5,000-meter distance event at that Olympics, in the time of 14 minutes 46.8 seconds, behind Finland's Gunnar Höckert's Olympic record time of 14 minutes 22.2 seconds (world record holder Lehtinen was second, and Zamperini's teammate, Lash, 13th). However, his final lap of 56 seconds was fast enough to catch the attention of Adolf Hitler, who afterwards had Zamperini come to his stand, where as Zamperini told the story, Hitler shook his hand, and said, "Ah, you're the boy with the fast finish."

Collegiate career
After the Olympics, Zamperini enrolled as a student at the University of Southern California. At USC, he was a member of the Kappa Sigma Fraternity (Delta-Eta Chapter). In 1938, Zamperini set a national collegiate mile (1609 meters) record of 4 minutes 8.3 seconds, despite severe cuts to his shins from competitors attempting to spike him during the race; this record lasted for fifteen years, earning him the nickname "Torrance Tornado."

World War II service

Zamperini enlisted in the United States Army Air Force in September 1941 and earned a commission as a second lieutenant. He was posted to the Pacific island of Funafuti as a bombardier on the Consolidated B-24 Liberator bomber Super Man.

In April 1943, Super Man participated in a bombing mission against the Japanese-held island of Nauru, with Zamperini serving as bombardier. Following the successful raid, his craft was attacked by three Japanese Zeros and the bomber was severely damaged. Five of the crew were wounded, one of whom died. The May 4 New York Times credited Zamperini with administering first aid to the five wounded members of his Liberator bomber crew and saving the lives of two on the return flight from the April 21 Nauru raid. "Ground crewmen counted 500 bullet and shell fragment holes in the fuselage and tail structure of the big four-engine bomber after it had skidded to a stop with a flat tire."

Lost during search mission
With Super Man no longer airworthy, the healthy crew members were transferred to Hawaii for reassignment. Zamperini, along with some other former Super Man crewmates, was assigned to conduct a search for a lost aircraft and crew.  They were given another B-24, Green Hornet, notorious among the pilots as a defective "lemon." (Aircraft records show several B-24s with the name: "Green Hornet" and "The Green Hornet"; in this case the name was verified from Zamperini's diary before the mission.) In May 1943, before his last mission, Louis ran a mile in under 4 minutes, 12 seconds. This is an immense achievement, considering he was running in sand.

The three survivors were Zamperini, pilot Russell Allen Phillips and Francis McNamara; with little food and no water, they subsisted on rainwater, small fish eaten raw, and birds that landed on their raft. McNamara ate all the chocolate they had in a panic, but he later redeemed himself by using an oar to defend the survivors from a shark attack. They attempted to gain the attention of a search plane, but failed. With the few tools they were able to salvage from the crash, the men were able to manage on two small rafts that got released. They caught two albatrosses, one of which they ate, and used pieces as bait to catch fish, all while fending off constant shark attacks and nearly being capsized by a storm. They were strafed a number of times by a Japanese bomber, which punctured their life raft, but no one was hit. After 33 days at sea, McNamara died; Zamperini and Phillips wrapped up his body and pushed it overboard.

Prisoner of war
On their 47th day adrift, with little food or water, Zamperini and Phillips reached the Marshall Islands and were immediately taken prisoner by the Japanese Navy. They were held in captivity, severely beaten, and mistreated until the end of the war in August 1945. Initially held at Kwajalein Atoll, after 42 days they were transferred to the Japanese prisoner-of-war camp at Ōfuna, for captives who were not registered as prisoners of war (POWs). After slightly over a year in Ofuna, Zamperini was transferred to Tokyo's Ōmori POW camp, and was eventually transferred to the Naoetsu POW camp in northern Japan, where he remained until the war ended. He was tormented by prison guard Mutsuhiro "The Bird" Watanabe, who was later included in General Douglas MacArthur's list of the forty most wanted war criminals in Japan.

Zamperini was held at the same camp as then-Major Greg "Pappy" Boyington, and in his book, Baa Baa Black Sheep, Boyington describes the Italian recipes Zamperini wrote to keep the prisoners' minds off the food and conditions.

Post-war life

Zamperini had at first been declared missing at sea, and then, a year and a day after his disappearance, killed in action. When he eventually returned home, he received a hero's welcome.

Zamperini and Cynthia Applewhite were married in 1946, until her death in 2001; they had two children, Cissy and Luke.

Evangelism
In a televised interview on the Christian Broadcasting Network in 2003, Zamperini related that after the war, he had nightmares about strangling his former captors and began drinking heavily, trying to forget his experiences as a POW.<ref name="CBN">{{Cite web |title=Unbroken'''s Louis Zamperini: The rest of the story |url=http://www.cbn.com/tv/1422057738001 |access-date=9 March 2015 |website=CBN |df=dmy-all}}</ref> His wife Cynthia attended one of the evangelistic crusades led by Billy Graham in Los Angeles, and became a born-again Christian. In 1949, at the encouragement of his wife and her Christian friends, Zamperini reluctantly agreed to attend a crusade. Graham's preaching reminded him of his prayers during his time on the life raft and imprisonment, and Zamperini committed his life to Christ. Following this, he forgave his captors, and his nightmares ceased.

Later Graham helped Zamperini launch a new career as a Christian evangelist. One of his recurring themes was forgiveness, and he visited many of the guards from his POW days to let them know that he had forgiven them. This included an October 1950 visit to Sugamo Prison in Tokyo, where many war criminals were imprisoned, and expressed forgiveness to them. Zamperini told CBN that some became Christians in response.

Last years

Four days before his 81st birthday in January 1998, Zamperini ran a leg in the Olympic Torch relay for the Winter Olympics in Nagano, Japan, not far from the POW camp where he had been held. While there, he attempted to meet with his chief and most brutal tormentor during the war, Mutsuhiro Watanabe, also known as "the Bird", who had evaded prosecution as a war criminal, but Watanabe refused to see him. However, Zamperini sent him a letter, stating that while he suffered great mistreatment from him, he forgave him. It is unknown whether Watanabe even read the letter; Zamperini never received any response, and Watanabe died in 2003. In March 2005, Zamperini returned to Germany to visit the Berlin Olympic Stadium for the first time since he had competed there.

In his 90s, Zamperini continued to attend USC football games, and he befriended star quarterback Matt Barkley in 2009.

Zamperini appeared on The Tonight Show with Jay Leno on June 7, 2012, speaking about his life in general, the 1936 Olympics, and his World War II exploits.

Death
During his World War II service, Zamperini's death had mistakenly been announced when the US government classified him as killed in action. President Franklin D. Roosevelt even sent Zamperini's parents a formal condolence note in 1944. It was not until the end of World War II in late 1945 that Zamperini was discovered to still be alive and freed from his captors.

Zamperini's actual death came 70 years later, when he died of pneumonia on July 2, 2014, at his home in Los Angeles; he was 97.

Media

Biographies and memoirs
Zamperini wrote two memoirs about his experiences, both bearing the same title, Devil at My Heels, but with different co-authors and content.

Author Laura Hillenbrand wrote a biography of Zamperini entitled Unbroken: A World War II Story of Survival, Resilience, and Redemption (2010) and published by Random House, was a #1 New York Times bestseller. It was named the top nonfiction book of 2010 by Time Magazine.

Film
The book Unbroken: A World War II Story of Survival, Resilience, and Redemption was twice adapted into film. First, Unbroken by the Coen brothers, was directed by Angelina Jolie, and starred Jack O'Connell as Zamperini. It covered the time up to Zamperini's return from the war. Later, a sequel, Unbroken: Path to Redemption, covers Zamperini's recovery from his abuse as a POW, and was directed by Harold Cronk, and was released in September 2018, with Samuel Hunt portraying Zamperini.

In 2015, the Billy Graham organization released a 30-minute documentary film, Captured by Grace. The film focused on Zamperini's faith, to which he credited his "unbroken" status.

In popular culture
Zamperini features as a character in the 2012 novel Flight from Berlin by David John, published by Harper Collins.

In sports
Zamperini is an Irish horse named after Louis trained by G. L Moore.

Legacy and awards
 USAAF Decorations

 A race at Madison Square Garden was named the Louis Zamperini Invitational Mile.
 On 7 December 1946, Torrance Airport was named Zamperini Field after him.
 Zamperini was a torchbearer for the 1984 Summer Olympic Games in Los Angeles and the 1998 Winter Games in Nagano.
 Torrance High School's home football, soccer, and track stadium was named Zamperini Stadium, and the entrance plaza at USC's track & field stadium was named Louis Zamperini Plaza'' in 2004.
 On 10 May 2008, Zamperini was awarded the Ellis Island Medal of Honor by the National Ethnic Coalition of Organizations.
 In October 2008, Zamperini was inducted into the National Italian American Sports Hall of Fame in Chicago, Illinois.
 On 24 April 2011, Zamperini received an honorary degree, Doctor of Humane Letters from Azusa Pacific University.
 On 20 May 2011, Zamperini delivered Bryant University's 2011 baccalaureate address and received Bryant's inaugural Distinguished Character Award.
 On 21 May 2011, Bryant University presented Zamperini with an honorary degree, Doctor of Humane Letters.
 On 22 May 2011, Zamperini threw out the ceremonial first pitch before the Red Sox-Cubs game at Fenway Park in Boston.
 In late July 2011, Zamperini received the Kappa Sigma Golden Heart Award during the Kappa Sigma 68th Biennial Grand Conclave held at the Flamingo Casino in Las Vegas, Nevada.
 In May 2011, Zamperini was guest of honor at Magellan Christian Academy's graduation ceremony with over 700 attendees at the University of North Florida in Jacksonville, Florida. Lorrie Blitch, owner of Magellan Christian Academy, was so moved after reading about his life, he was asked to speak at their private Christian school graduation ceremony. Zamperini's presentation was so inspirational that he received a 10-minute standing ovation.
 He was chosen to serve as Grand Marshal of the 2015 Rose Parade, held before the college football playoff game in his home state of California. After Zamperini's death on 2 July 2014, the Tournament announced that it is "committed to honoring him as the Grand Marshal of the 2015 Rose Parade". At the parade, Zamperini's family followed USC mascot Traveler as a riderless horse.
 On January 16 2013, The USAG-KA (Kwajalein Atoll) Dining Facility was renamed The Captain Louis S. Zamperini Dining Facility in honor of Louis Zamperini.
 In the fall of 2015, Zamperini was named as the class exemplar for the United States Air Force Academy Class of 2018 for his character and courage in service to his country in the United States Army Air Force.
 In 2017, a 2-mile stretch of the 405 Freeway between Redondo Beach Boulevard and Western Avenue (border to border the portion within the city of Torrance) was named the Louis Zamperini Memorial Highway.

See also

 Four-minute mile
 List of people who disappeared mysteriously at sea

Notes

Citations

Bibliography

External links

 
 
 

1917 births
2014 deaths
20th-century evangelicals
20th-century Roman Catholics
21st-century evangelicals
1940s missing person cases
American evangelicals
American evangelists
American expatriate sportspeople in Japan
American male long-distance runners
American memoirists
American motivational speakers
American prisoners of war in World War II
American people of Italian descent
American torture victims
Athletes (track and field) at the 1936 Summer Olympics
Castaways
Converts to evangelical Christianity from Roman Catholicism
Formerly missing people
Deaths from pneumonia in California
Military personnel from California
Missing in action of World War II
Missing person cases in Hawaii
Olympic track and field athletes of the United States
People from Greater Los Angeles
People from Olean, New York
Recipients of the Distinguished Flying Cross (United States)
Shot-down aviators
Sportspeople from Torrance, California
Torrance High School alumni
Track and field athletes from California
United States Air Force airmen
United States Army Air Forces officers
United States Army Air Forces personnel of World War II
University of Southern California alumni
World War II prisoners of war held by Japan
Writers from California
Writers from New York (state)